Emma Terebo (born 10 July 1998) is a swimmer who represents New Caledonia. At the 2015 Pacific Games, Terebo won eight gold medals, five in individual events and three in relays, including setting three games records in the individual events. In 2019, she competed at the 2019 Pacific Games held in Samoa.

See also
 Swimming at the 2015 Pacific Games

References

External links
 

1998 births
Living people
New Caledonian female swimmers
Place of birth missing (living people)
Swimmers at the 2014 Summer Youth Olympics
Florida State Seminoles women's swimmers
French female backstroke swimmers
European Aquatics Championships medalists in swimming